Nik Forrest (born 1964) is a visual and media artist who lives in Montreal. Born in Edinburgh, their practice includes drawing, installation and sound art.  They completed a Bachelor of Fine Arts from the University of Saskatchewan in 1985 and a master's degree in open media from Concordia University in 1995.

They are best known for their short experimental videos. They have participated in international artist residencies including the CALQ residency in Buenos Aires, Argentina and The Canada Council studio at Cite Internationale des Arts in Paris. Their work is included in collections at The National Gallery of Canada, The Saskatchewan Arts Board and Concordia University.

They directed the film My Heart the Rock Star in 2001 as part of a collaborative video series with artists Annie Martin and Nelson Henricks titled "My Heart." This was a reflective piece focusing on childhood memory and gender fluctuation. They have been involved in sound and video performances including Leibig12 (in collaboration with audio artist Nancy Tobin) in Berlin in 2014.

Expositions 
Selected solo and group exhibitions:
 (2019) "Où sommes-nous" Kunsthalle Mulhouse Mulhouse, France
 (2018) “Où sommes-nous” Oboro, Montréal, Canada 
 (2018) “Transformables (Part 2)” Latitude 53, Edmonton, Canada
 (2018) “Contaminations” Eastern Block, Montréal, Canada 
 (2016) “Transformables” Eastern Block, Montréal, Canada 
 (2016) “Sounds Like” Paved Arts, Saskatoon, Canada
 (2015) “Pictures For Listening” Vox, Montreal, Canada 
 (2012) “Flip/Bend” La Centrale, Montreal, Canada
 (2009) “Observations Part 2“, SBC Galerie d'art contemporain, Montréal, Canada 
 (2009) “Observations Part 1“, SBC Galerie d'art contemporain, Montréal, Canada 
 (2005) “Ectoplasmes“, Société des arts technologiques, Montréal, Canada 
 (2004) “Video Heroes“, Cambridge Galleries, Ontario, Canada 
 (2002) “Placing Spaces“, Spacing Places, MSVU Art Gallery, Halifax, Canada 
 (2002)  “Drift“, Galerie Powerhouse, Montréal, Canada, collaboration with Jackie Gallant
 (1999) Stravaig - Errance, Videographe Gallery, Montreal, Canada
 (1998) Video d'Ecossee, Articule Gallery, Montreal, Canada
 (1995) Noise Box / Temporary Room, Optica Gallery, Montreal and AKA Gallery, Saskatoon, Saskatchewan

Notes

References
Forrest, Nikki. 1998. Vidéos d'Écosse = Video from Scotland. Montréal: Articule. 
Forrest, Nikki. 1999. Nikki Forrest: stravaig/errance. Hull, Quebec: Daïmõn, centre de production.
Vance, Anne. “Who’s Afraid of Film and Video in Scotland? The exhibition of Single-screen Film and Video: Canadian Fall.” Variant issue 9 (1998) 1–7.
Cammaer, Gerda. Placing Spaces, Spacing Places: Canadian Experimental Films and Videos since 1990.  Halifax: MSVU Art Gallery, 2003.
Redfern, Christine. “Radioactive Video Stars” Montreal Mirror, Vol. 19 No. 24, 2003.

External links 
 https://nikforrest.org/
 http://givideo.org/1/?s=nikki+forrest#tab-2-tab
 http://www.vitheque.com/Ficheauteur/tabid/189/language/fr-CA/Default.aspx?id=83
 http://www.mediaqueer.ca/artist/nikki-forrest
 http://nomorepotlucks.org/site/material-traces-video-sound-and-drawing-by-nikki-forrest/
 National Gallery of Canada https://www.gallery.ca/en/see/collections/artist.php?iartistid=10817

1964 births
Living people
Canadian sound artists
Women sound artists
Canadian installation artists
Artists from Edinburgh
Scottish emigrants to Canada
University of Saskatchewan alumni
Concordia University alumni
Artists from Montreal